Lithophasia venosula is a moth of the family Noctuidae. The species was first described by Otto Staudinger in 1892. It is probably endemic of the Levant. Thus far it has only been recorded from Lebanon and the forests near Mount Meron in Israel.

Adults are on wing in October. There is probably one generation per year.

External links

Cuculliinae
Moths of the Middle East
Moths described in 1892